Blas Oliveras Mercado (born ca. 1880 – died ca. 1950) was a Puerto Rican politician and Mayor of Ponce, Puerto Rico, from 1933 to 1937.

Honors
Oliveras Mercado is honored at Ponce's Park of Illustrious Ponce Citizens.  Only six others, of over 100 former Ponce mayors, are honored there. In 1950, a bridge in Ponce was named after Blas Silva.

See also

 List of Puerto Ricans
 List of mayors of Ponce, Puerto Rico

References

Further reading
 Fay Fowlie de Flores. Ponce, Perla del Sur: Una Bibliografía Anotada. Segunda Edición. 1997. Ponce, Puerto Rico: Universidad de Puerto Rico en Ponce. p. 340. Item 1690. 
Zapata Oliveras, Carlos R. Situación política, económica y administrativa de Ponce durante la incumbencia de Blas Oliveras (enero 1933-enero 1937). Programa Graduado de Historia, Facultad de Humanidades, Universidad de Puerto Rico, Recinto de Río Piedras. 1980. 242 pages. (Tesis de Maestría [Master's Thesis]) (In Spanish) (UPR-RP; CUTPO-fotocopia)
 Fay Fowlie de Flores. Ponce, Perla del Sur: Una Bibliográfica Anotada. Second Edition. 1997. Ponce, Puerto Rico: Universidad de Puerto Rico en Ponce. p. 123. Item 621. 
 Cabañas Vazquez, R. "Nuestros hombres." Boletin de la Liga Puertorriqueña e Hispana. 1 enero de 1928. p. 11. Includes a B&W photo. (Colegio Universitario Tecnológico de Ponce, CUTPO)
 Fay Fowlie de Flores. Ponce, Perla del Sur: Una Bibliográfica Anotada. Second Edition. 1997. Ponce, Puerto Rico: Universidad de Puerto Rico en Ponce. p. 173. Item 880. 
 Carnaval de Ponce: programa. Ponce, Puerto Rico. 196x? - . Includes photos. (Archivo Histórico Municipal de Ponce, AHMP; Colegio Universitario Tecnológico de Ponce, CUTPO)
 Fay Fowlie de Flores. Ponce, Perla del Sur: Una Bibliográfica Anotada. Second Edition. 1997. Ponce, Puerto Rico: Universidad de Puerto Rico en Ponce. p. 333. Item 1658. 
 Municipio de Ponce. Oficina del Alcalde. Informe de la gestión administrativa del Municipio de Ponce, P.R., 1932–1937, con ilustraciones y comentarios. Ponce, Puerto Rico: s.n., 1944. (Colegio Universitario Tecnológico de Ponce, CUTPO)
 Fay Fowlie de Flores. Ponce, Perla del Sur: Una Bibliografía Anotada. Second Edition. 1997. Ponce, Puerto Rico: Universidad de Puerto Rico en Ponce. p. 338. Item 1683. 
 M. Rivera de la Vega. "La deuda municipal." Puerto Rico.'' [Barranquilla, Colombia?: s.n., Colección America?]  Volumen 1 (Febrero de 1936) pp. 339–345. (Colegio Universitario Tecnológico de Ponce, CUTPO)

Mayors of Ponce, Puerto Rico
1880s births
1950 deaths
Year of death uncertain
Year of birth uncertain